The Newcastle Jets 2009–10 season was the Newcastle Jets' fifth season since the inception of the A-League and ninth since the club's founding, in 2000.

Players

First team squad

 * Injury replacement player for Marko Jesic.
 ** Injury replacement player for Shaun Ontong.

Youth Squad

Transfers
In:

 Dion Shaw – Promoted from youth team
 Michael Bridges – Milton Keynes Dons
 Labinot Haliti – ŁKS Łódź
 Ali Abbas Al-Hilfi – Marconi FC
 Chris Triantis – Sydney Olympic FC
 Fabio Vignaroli – Contract Extended
 Neil Young – Melbourne Knights

Out:

 Adam Griffiths – Gold Coast United
 Joel Wood – Short Term ACL Contract Expired
 Peter Haynes – Short Term ACL Contract Expired
 Mitchell Johnson – Short Term ACL Contract Expired
 Nikolas Tsattalios – Short Term ACL Contract Expired
 Jesse Pinto – Short Term ACL Contract Expired, Returned to Youth Team
 Jarrad Ross – Short Term ACL Contract Expired, Returned to Youth Team
 Ben McNamara – Short Term ACL Contract Expired

Trialists:
 Wang Dong
 Xiao Zhanbo
 Andrea Merenda
 Stephen Carson
 Jorge Florentin
 Felipe Garcia
 Federico Arias

Contract extensions
 Tarek Elrich – 2 years
 Marko Jesic – 2 years
 Ben Kennedy – 2 years
 Labinot Haliti – 2 years
 Michael Bridges – 2 years

Matches

Pre-season friendlies

2009–10 Hyundai A-League fixtures

2009–10 Finals series

Statistics

Goal scorers

Notes

References

External links
Official club website
Official A-League website
Unofficial supporters website
Official Squadron website

2009-10
2009–10 A-League season by team